Upravlyaemy Sputnik Kontinentalny Statsionarny ( meaning Stationary Continental Controllable Satellite), or US-KS, also known as Oko-S, was a series of Soviet, and later Russian, missile detection satellites launched as part of the Oko programme. US-KS was a derivative of the US-K satellite, optimised for operations in geosynchronous orbit. Seven were launched between 1975 and 1997, when launches ended in favour of the modernised US-KMO. US-KS had the GRAU index 74Kh6. As of December 2015, the entire Oko programme is being replaced by the new EKS system.

US-KS satellites were launched by Proton-K carrier rockets, with Blok DM and DM-2 upper stages. The first satellite to be launched was a prototype, which was followed by six operational spacecraft. With a spacecraft positioned at a longitude of 24° West, the Soviet Union could continuously monitor missile launches from the United States.

References

Oko
Military satellites
Military satellites of Russia